Ophiusa alticola is a moth of the family Erebidae first described by George Hampson in 1913. It is found in India.

References

Ophiusa
Moths described in 1913